The 50th parallel north is a circle of latitude that is 50 degrees north of the Earth's equatorial plane. It crosses Europe, Asia, the Pacific Ocean, North America, and the Atlantic Ocean.

At this latitude the sun is visible for 16 hours, 22 minutes during the summer solstice and 8 hours, 4 minutes during the winter solstice.
The maximum altitude of the sun during the summer solstice is 63.44 degrees and during the winter solstice it is 16.56 degrees. During the summer solstice, nighttime does not get beyond astronomical twilight, a condition which lasts throughout the month of June. Everyday of the month of May can view both astronomical dawn and dusk.

At this latitude, the average sea surface temperature between 1982 and 2011 was about 8.5 °C (47.3 °F).

In the mainland 48 states of USA, which is 100% south of the 50th parallel north, everyday of the month of May (May 1st to 31st) can view both astronomical dawn and dusk. Also in the mainland 48 states of USA, between November 1st and November 30th the Sun is always 18 degrees above the horizon as solar noon.

Around the world

Starting at the Prime Meridian and heading eastwards, the parallel 50° north passes through:

{| class="wikitable plainrowheaders"
! scope="col" width="125" | Co-ordinates
! scope="col" | Country, territory or sea
! scope="col" | Notes
|-
| style="background:#b0e0e6;" | 
! scope="row" style="background:#b0e0e6;" | English Channel
| style="background:#b0e0e6;" |
|-valign="top"
| 
! scope="row" | 
| Upper Normandy — for about 20 kmPicardy — passing just north of AmiensNord-Pas-de-Calais — for about 13 km
|-
| 
! scope="row" | 
| Wallonia
|-
| 
! scope="row" | 
| Champagne-Ardenne — for about 10 km
|-
| 
! scope="row" | 
| Wallonia
|-
| 
! scope="row" | 
| Diekirch District
|-valign="top"
| 
! scope="row" | 
| Rhineland-Palatinate Hesse Rhineland-Palatinate — passing through Mainz city centre Hesse — passing just south of Frankfurt, crossing a runway of FRA international airport and passing just south of DCF77 time signal transmitter Bavaria — passing just north of Bayreuth
|-
| 
! scope="row" | 
| Passing through southern parts of Prague
|-
| 
! scope="row" | 
| For about 11 km
|-
| 
! scope="row" | 
| For about 10 km
|-valign="top"
| 
! scope="row" | 
| Passing through southern districts of Kraków (on the 20th meridian east)Passing through southern districts of Tarnów (on the 21st meridian east)Passing through southern districts of Rzeszów (on the 22nd meridian east)
|-valign="top"
| 
! scope="row" | 
| Lviv Oblast — passing just north of Lviv Ternopil Oblast — passing  through Pochaiv Khmelnytskyi Oblast Zhytomyr Oblast — passing  through Andrushivka Kyiv Oblast Cherkasy Oblast Poltava Oblast — passing  through Lubny Kharkiv Oblast — passing through Kharkiv city centre
|-
| 
! scope="row" | 
| Belgorod Oblast — for about 18 km
|-
| 
! scope="row" | 
| Luhansk Oblast — for about 12 km
|-valign="top"
| 
! scope="row" | 
| Belgorod Oblast Voronezh Oblast — passing just north of Boguchar Rostov Oblast Volgograd Oblast — passing just south of Kamyshin
|-
| 
! scope="row" | 
| West Kazakhstan Province
|-
| 
! scope="row" | 
| Saratov Oblast
|-valign="top"
| 
! scope="row" | 
| West Kazakhstan Province Aktobe Province Kostanay Province Karagandy Province — passing just north of Karaganda East Kazakhstan Province — passing just north of Oskemen
|-valign="top"
| 
! scope="row" | 
| Altai Republic Tuva
|-
| 
! scope="row" | 
| Passing through the southern tip of Uvs Lake
|-
| 
! scope="row" | 
| Tuva
|-
| 
! scope="row" | 
| For about 11 km
|-
| 
! scope="row" | 
| Tuva — for about 7 km
|-
| 
! scope="row" | 
| For about 11 km
|-
| 
! scope="row" | 
| Tuva
|-
| 
! scope="row" | 
|
|-
| 
! scope="row" | 
| Buryatia — for about 5 km
|-
| 
! scope="row" | 
| For about 3 km
|-valign="top"
| 
! scope="row" | 
| Buryatia Zabaykalsky Krai
|-
| 
! scope="row" | 
|
|-
| 
! scope="row" | 
| Zabaykalsky Krai
|-
| 
! scope="row" | 
|
|-
| 
! scope="row" | 
| Zabaykalsky Krai
|-valign="top"
| 
! scope="row" | 
| Inner Mongolia Heilongjiang
|-valign="top"
| 
! scope="row" | 
| Amur Oblast Khabarovsk Krai
|-
| style="background:#b0e0e6;" | 
! scope="row" style="background:#b0e0e6;" | Strait of Tartary
| style="background:#b0e0e6;" |
|-
| 
! scope="row" | 
| Sakhalin Oblast — island of Sakhalin
|-
| style="background:#b0e0e6;" | 
! scope="row" style="background:#b0e0e6;" | Sea of Okhotsk
| style="background:#b0e0e6;" |
|-
| 
! scope="row" | 
| Sakhalin Oblast — island of Paramushir
|-
| style="background:#b0e0e6;" | 
! scope="row" style="background:#b0e0e6;" | Pacific Ocean
| style="background:#b0e0e6;" |
|-valign="top"
| 
! scope="row" | 
| British Columbia — Vancouver Island (passing through the town of Campbell River) and mainland, also through the Okanagan Valley immediately north of Kelowna. Alberta — passing through the city of Medicine Hat Saskatchewan it passes a few km south of the cities of Swift Current, Moose Jaw and the capital, Regina Manitoba — passing just north of Winnipeg Ontario — passing through Lake Nipigon Quebec - passing through the town of Port-Cartier
|-
| style="background:#b0e0e6;" | 
! scope="row" style="background:#b0e0e6;" | Gulf of Saint Lawrence
| style="background:#b0e0e6;" | Passing just north of Anticosti Island, Quebec, 
|-
| 
! scope="row" | 
| Newfoundland and Labrador — island of Newfoundland
|-
| style="background:#b0e0e6;" | 
! scope="row" style="background:#b0e0e6;" | White Bay
| style="background:#b0e0e6;" |
|-
| 
! scope="row" | 
| Newfoundland and Labrador — island of Newfoundland
|-
| style="background:#b0e0e6;" | 
! scope="row" style="background:#b0e0e6;" | Atlantic Ocean
| style="background:#b0e0e6;" | Confusion Bay
|-
| 
! scope="row" | 
| Newfoundland and Labrador — island of Newfoundland
|-
| style="background:#b0e0e6;" | 
! scope="row" style="background:#b0e0e6;" | Atlantic Ocean
| style="background:#b0e0e6;" | Passing just north of the Isles of Scilly, England, 
|-
| 
! scope="row" | 
| England — Lizard Peninsula, Cornwall, for about 7 km
|-
| style="background:#b0e0e6;" | 
! scope="row" style="background:#b0e0e6;" | English Channel
| style="background:#b0e0e6;" |
|}

Sakhalin island

From the signing of the 1875 Treaty of Saint Petersburg until the Russo-Japanese War which broke in 1904, the Russian Empire had full control of Sakhalin island. As a result of the 1905 Treaty of Portsmouth that brought an end to the Russo-Japanese War, the portion of the island south of the 50th parallel line became Japanese territory, part of Karafuto Prefecture. However, following the month long Soviet–Japanese War during the summer of 1945, the entire island was reunified under Soviet control.

See also
49th parallel north
51st parallel north

References

External links 

n50